Western Springs is a residential suburb in the city of Auckland in the north of New Zealand. It is located four kilometres to the west of the city centre, Auckland CBD. The park is situated to the north of State Highway 16 and the residential suburb is located southeast of the park on the opposite side of State Highway 16.

The suburb is dominated by Western Springs Reserve (featuring a lake with a variety of birdlife), within which are situated Auckland Zoo, Western Springs Stadium and M.O.T.A.T. (the Museum of Transport and Technology). The park is the location of the annual Pasifika Festival, one of Auckland's most popular public events.

History

The Māori valued Waiorea (Western Springs) for the clean, clear spring water and eels that lived in the stream. After colonisation, the area was part of a block of land farmed by William Motion, a Scottish settler.

The area was called Western Springs to differentiate it from the springs in the Auckland Domain to the east of the town. The main source of the water that feeds the lake at Western Springs is rain falling on the slopes of the volcanoes Te Tatua-a-Riukiuta, Mount Albert and Maungawhau / Mount Eden. The water runs underground for several miles through the lava flows, and emerges from the ground at a constant rate that is well filtered by the miles of scoria rocks.

As the city of Auckland grew, it found that well water was not sufficient. In the 1860s a pipe from the Domain Springs was constructed, however a more permanent solution was needed for the growing need for water. In 1874, the council tasked Australian civil engineer Edward Orpen Moriarty with the task of supplying Auckland with water from Western Springs. In 1874 the city bought William Motion's mill and 120 acres (486,000 m2) of land including the spring. In 1875, the swampy ground was made into a 15-acre (6ha) artificial lake 6 feet in depth and capable of holding 22 million gallons of water.

A pumphouse, which opened in 1877, was designed by City Engineer William Errington and built of brick. It was fitted with a steam engine, known as a beam engine, which is still in working order having been restored. The engine pumped water up to the two new reservoirs; one on the corner of Ponsonby Road and Karangahape Road and the other in the block bordered by Khyber Pass Road, Symonds Street, Mount Eden Road and Burleigh Street from where the water was gravity fed down to the city.

The cost of maintaining the pump was high however and by the end of the 19th century, Auckland's growth required a much greater and more reliable source of freshwater. This coincided with pressure to safeguard the remaining native forests of the Waitākere Ranges to the west of the city. Auckland City purchased land and built large reservoirs in this secluded area, thus safeguarding both the water quality and the flora & fauna of the area. The height of the reservoirs above sea level meant pumping was kept to a minimum as the water could be gravity fed down to town. The pumphouse ceased being used in 1936 after the Waitākere Ranges dams became operational.

This left the Western Springs area with no specific use. The rough and uneven land was unsuitable for housing as apart from the lake it contained large stretches of boggy ground. Unable to divest itself of the land, the Auckland City Council was at a loss what to do with it. Some light industry and market gardens were developed along Great North Road and Chinamans hill [so-called because of the Chinese market gardeners] and an attempt was made to convert the boggy land around the lake into a park. However over the next thirty years or so most of the land deteriorated as it became overgrown and used for illegal rubbish dumping.

From the early 1920s onwards various developments took place; The Auckland City Council Zoological Gardens were established to the north of the lake. To the west (around the corner of Motions Road and Great North Road) a camping ground was set up (during World War II it was converted into a transit camp for American servicemen). To the south of the lake was established a golf club (Chamberlain Park) and to the west, land was set aside for primary, intermediate and secondary schools to service the growing suburbs of Westmere and Point Chevalier.

The council used some of the more usable land to construct council housing in the 1920s, and in the 1930s sold much of the land previously used for market gardens to the government for state housing. To the north of the zoo was an area of mangrove swamp where the Western Springs creek reached the sea near the Meola Reef lava outcrop. This was utilised as a landfill dump and hence reclaimed during the 1950s and 1960s. The reclaimed land was developed as playing fields and an additional area for the MOTAT Airfield, the Sir Keith Park Memorial Airfield (Motat 2), and is also the site of the Westpoint Performing Arts Center. In the 2000s the landfill was found to be emitting methane gas and was subsequently capped with clay.

After the war, the population of the surrounding suburbs grew markedly and it became obvious that the untidy state of Western Springs was an embarrassment. As a wilderness of bogs full of rubbish, rats and mosquitoes, it was not only unattractive but a potential health hazard. In 1961 the Auckland City Council embarked on developing the park in earnest. The lake, which had become completely choked by introduced waterweed was reclaimed and the overgrown landscape was carefully cleared of weeds and rubbish.

In 1953 a plan was put forward to use the area around the lake as an amusement park with a scenic railway, fairground and rollercoasters etc. but this was soon discovered to be beyond the financial capabilities of the Auckland City Council.

In 1964 the Museum of Transport and Technology (MOTAT) was established to the south east of the lake, the old pumphouse forming its centrepiece.

By the 1980s major landscaping work had transformed the area from an eyesore to being one of Auckland's most attractive parks. New plantings were introduced to complement the mature trees from the 19th century and careful planting of the islands of the lake and the wetlands surrounding it have made it a successful breeding ground for a large variety of waterfowl both native and exotic. Artworks by several New Zealand sculptors were sited in the park during the 1980s and 1990s.

Demographics

Westmere South-Western Springs had a population of 3,099 at the 2018 New Zealand census, an increase of 60 people (2.0%) since the 2013 census, and an increase of 315 people (11.3%) since the 2006 census. There were 1,074 households, comprising 1,473 males and 1,629 females, giving a sex ratio of 0.9 males per female. The median age was 37.6 years (compared with 37.4 years nationally), with 663 people (21.4%) aged under 15 years, 582 (18.8%) aged 15 to 29, 1,632 (52.7%) aged 30 to 64, and 225 (7.3%) aged 65 or older.

Ethnicities were 84.1% European/Pākehā, 11.6% Māori, 9.4% Pacific peoples, 6.4% Asian, and 3.2% other ethnicities. People may identify with more than one ethnicity.

The percentage of people born overseas was 23.3, compared with 27.1% nationally.

Although some people chose not to answer the census's question about religious affiliation, 62.7% had no religion, 27.5% were Christian, 0.1% had Māori religious beliefs, 0.9% were Hindu, 1.5% were Muslim, 0.7% were Buddhist and 2.0% had other religions.

Of those at least 15 years old, 1,221 (50.1%) people had a bachelor's or higher degree, and 159 (6.5%) people had no formal qualifications. The median income was $54,100, compared with $31,800 nationally. 966 people (39.7%) earned over $70,000 compared to 17.2% nationally. The employment status of those at least 15 was that 1,461 (60.0%) people were employed full-time, 408 (16.7%) were part-time, and 66 (2.7%) were unemployed.

Education

References 
Notes

Bibliography
 Decently And In Order, The Centennial History Of The Auckland City Council. G.W.A.Bush. Collins 1971
 The Beam Engine & Western Springs Pumping Station published by MOTAT 2008

External links 

 Photographs of Western Springs held in Auckland Libraries' heritage collections.

Suburbs of Auckland
Waitematā Local Board Area
Populated places around the Waitematā Harbour